Tatamagouche Airport  is an abandoned airport that was located  northwest of Tatamagouche, Colchester County, Nova Scotia, Canada.

The airstrip was owned and operated by the local Tim Hortons Children's Camp, the second camp built by the Tim Hortons Children's Foundation. The Tatamagouche air strip was used by the camp, as well as Tim Hortons co-founder Ron Joyce, who frequently flew to the area in the summer to visit his hometown and summer cottage.

Upon completion of Joyce's Fox Harb'r Golf Resort & Spa and its newer and larger airport Fox Harbour Airport, Tatamagouche Airport was closed and abandoned.

References

Defunct airports in Nova Scotia
Transport in Colchester County
Buildings and structures in Colchester County
Tatamagouche